Holt or holte may refer to:

Natural world 
Holt (den), an otter den
 Holt, an area of woodland

Places

Australia
 Holt, Australian Capital Territory
 Division of Holt, an electoral district in the Australian House of Representatives in Victoria

Canada
Holt, Ontario, a hamlet

Denmark
Holte, a town in Rudersdal municipality, Copenhagen county

Germany
Holt, Germany, a municipality in Schleswig-Holstein

Iceland
Holt (Akureyri), a residence in Sandgerðisbót Akureyri
Skálholt, the first bishopric of medieval Iceland and the site of a cathedral

The Netherlands
Holt, Overijssel, a town in Overijssel

Norway
 Holt, Aust-Agder, a former municipality in Aust-Agder county, Norway (now a part of Tvedestrand municipality)

Romania
 Holt, a village in Letea Veche Commune, Bacău County

United Kingdom
Holt, Dorset
Holt Heath, Dorset
Holt End, Hampshire
Holt Town, Manchester
Holt, Norfolk
Holt (North Norfolk Railway) railway station
Holt railway station, a closed station near Holt, Norfolk
Holt, Wiltshire
Holt Junction railway station, Wiltshire
Holt, Wrexham, Wales
Holt, Worcestershire
Holt Heath, Worcestershire
Holt End, Worcestershire
Holt Fleet, Worcestershire

United States

Holt, Alabama
Holt, California
Holt, Florida
Holt, Breckinridge County, Kentucky
Holt, Muhlenberg County, Kentucky
Holt, Michigan
Holt, Minnesota
Holt, Missouri
Holt, Ohio
Holt, Wisconsin
Holt County, Missouri
Holt County, Nebraska
Holt Township, Taylor County, Iowa
Holt Township, Fillmore County, Minnesota
Holt Township, Marshall County, Minnesota
Holt Township, Gage County, Nebraska
Holt Township, Adams County, North Dakota

People
Holt (surname), people with the surname Holt
Holte (surname), people with the surname Holte or Holthe

Companies 
Holt & Co., British army agents and private bankers, now part of NatWest Group
Henry Holt and Company, publishing company
Holt International Children's Services, U.S.-based adoption company
Holt Manufacturing Company, progenitor of Caterpillar
Holt McDougal, publishing company
Holt Renfrew, Canadian department store
John Holt plc, Nigerian conglomerate

See also

Holt's (disambiguation)
Justice Holt (disambiguation)

Holte
Hult (disambiguation)